Aja is a king featured in Hindu texts. He is the son of Raghu. His paternal grandfather is the pious king Dilipa. He rules the kingdom of Kosala on the southern banks of the river Sarayu, with Ayodhya as his capital. His wife Indumati is the princess of Vidarbha, and his son is Dasharatha, the father of Rama, an avatar of the Hindu deity Vishnu.

The name Aja is referenced in the Rigveda. In the second phase of Battle of Ten Kings (in RV 1.018.19), the local chieftain Bhida is stated to have been defeated along with three other tribes — Ajas, Śighras, and the Yakṣus by Sudas.

Legend 
Indumati used to be an apsara, a celestial damsel named Harini, in her previous birth. Once, Indra grew apprehensive of the rigorous penance practiced by the sage Trinabindu, and sent her against him for disrupting his penance. By exhibiting in front of him her attractive form, she succeeded in interrupting his penance. As a result, the enraged sage cursed her to be born as a mortal woman on earth, and remain there till she beholds celestial flower on the earth. In due course, she was born as a princess of Vidarbha, and chose king Aja as her husband during her svayamvara. Soon, Dasharatha was born to them. However, her time on earth soon came to its end. Once, while sage Narada was traversing the sky, a garland of his veena fell on Indumati, redeeming her from the curse. Regaining the form of an apsara, she vanished from the earth, leaving Aja behind. King Dasharatha was only eight months old when Indumati died.

Aja was so grief-stricken when his wife died that he ran into the palace and performed suicide. He is also described to have died due to heartbreak. 

Kalidasa's Raghuvamsha states that Vashishtha sent his student to console him. Aja, however, never recovered from his pain, and after having ruled for a few more years, he died.

References

External links 
 

Characters in the Ramayana
Solar dynasty